Gibbonsia is a genus of clinids native to the eastern Pacific ocean. The name of this genus honours the American naturalist, physician and founder member of the California Academy of Sciences, William P. Gibbons (1812-1897).

Species
There are currently three recognized species in this genus:
 Gibbonsia elegans (J. G. Cooper, 1864) (Spotted kelpfish)
 Gibbonsia metzi C. L. Hubbs, 1927 (Striped kelpfish)
 Gibbonsia montereyensis C. L. Hubbs, 1927 (Crevice kelpfish)

References

 
Clinidae
Taxa named by James Graham Cooper